Schizolobium is a genus of flowering plants in the legume family, Fabaceae. It belongs to the subfamily Caesalpinioideae.

Species
Schizolobium amazonicum
 Schizolobium parahyba (Vell.) S.F. Blake, 1919

References

Fabaceae genera
Caesalpinioideae